The Jamnagar–Porbandar line belongs to Western Railway of Rajkot Division.

History
The Jamnagar–Porbandar railway metre-gauge railway was opened for traffic in 1946 jointly by Porbandar Railway and Dwaraka & Jamnagar Railway. After then it was merged into Saurashtra Railway in April 1948. Later Western Railway came into existence on 5 November 1951. Gauge conversion of the Jamnagar–Porbandar section completed in the early 1980s.

References

5 ft 6 in gauge railways in India
Railway lines in Gujarat
Transport in Jamnagar